Uni Jógvanson Arge (born 20 January 1971 in Tórshavn) is a Faroese journalist, writer, musician, singer and a former international football striker.

career
Arge started is career with HB Tórshavn and made the first team in 1988. In June that year he came on as a substitute against IF from Fuglafjørður and scored shortly later. HB Tórshavn went on to win both the Championship and the Cup in 1988. Arge is the most scoring player in HB Tórshavn's history. He scored 182 goals in 232 matches and won the Championship three times and the Cup four times. HB were runners up in the League with Arge in the team four times and attended two more Cup finals, which they eventually lost.

In 1998, he moved to Iceland to join Leiftur in Ólafsfjørður and later IA in Akranes. In Iceland he played 50 matches and scored 22 goals. With IA he won the Cup in 2000 becoming the first Faroese footballer to win the Cup abroad. Together with the famous Faroese goalkeeper, Jens Martin Knudsen, he also was a finalist in 1998 with Leiftur, which were defeated 2-0 by IBV. Returning from Iceland in 2001 he joined HB Tórshavn and retired in 2002. He made a memorable comeback in 2005 when he came on as a substitute against TB from Tvøroyri and scored a stunner after only 40 seconds. Arge has played several matches in the European Cup for HB, Leiftur and Akranes and scored against Apoel Nicosia in a 1–1 draw with HB in 1997.

International career
Arge made his debut for the Faroe Islands national football team in an August 1992 friendly match against Israel and earned 37 caps and 8 goals between 1992 and 2002.
He is most memorable for scoring his country's first ever World Cup goal against Cyprus in April 1993. His goal against Spain in the Faroe Islands in 1996 is also famous for his celebration after defeating the world's best goalkeeper at that time, Zubizarreta.

One of his best performances was in the 2–2 draw against Bosnia Herzegovina on homeground in 1999, where he scored both the Faroese goals. He also had his influence on the remarkable comeback against Slovenia in the Faroes in 2000, where the Faroese team came from being behind 0–2 to clinch a 2–2 draw three minutes from time with goals from Arge and Øssur Hansen. On the national team Arge formed a great attacking duo together with former FC Copenhagen star striker Todi Jónsson.

International goals
Scores and results list Faroe Islands' goal tally first.

Bibliography
Uni Arge is an educated journalist from The Danish School of Journalism in Aarhus, Denmark, and has for many years worked for different Faroese media sources, both as employed and free-lance, also during his years as an international footballer. In 2004, he published his first book "Komin er nú onnur øld", analysing various political and social aspects of life on the Faroes. In 2011, he published his second book Framtíðin kallar (Future is calling). Since then he has written five more books.
Komin er nú onnur øld, Tjarnardeild, Tórshavn, 2004. 
Framtíðin kallar, Sprotin, Tórshavn, 2011.  
Sálarfrøðingar í Føroyum - 1973–2013, Felagið Føroyskir Sálarfrøðingar 2014
Føroyar framá - ÍSF 75 ár, ÍSF 2014
Gróður í Havn, Tórshavnar kommuna, 2018
Føroyskir magistarar, Magistarafelag Føroya 1984–2019, 2021
Pedagogar í Føroyum - Føroya Pedagogfelag 1982-2022, 2022

Discography
In November 2007, Arge released his first solo album, "Mitt í sjónum", which has two meanings, it can mean "in the middle of the ocean" and "in the middle of visions". In July 2009 he released his second album, "Meldurtíð," and in November 2014 his third album, "Meðan vindurin strýkur," was released. He has written all the songs himself and performs as a singer and a guitarist on all three albums together with some of the Faroe Islands' finest musicians. Many of his songs have become popular on the islands, the song "Býarmynd" being the most popular on Spotify with 161.000 streamings. In 1997 he wrote the lyrics on the album "Síðsta skríggj". These are his albums:

"Síðsta skríggj", 1997, lyrics
"Mitt í sjónum", 2007
"Meldurtíð", 2009
"Meðan vindurin strýkur", 2014

Documentaries
As a journalist Arge has written and narrated several radio og TV programs, often with historical content. These are some of his TV documentaries.
  
Lítla Dímun - gimsteinurin í sjónum, 71 min., 2014
Varðin - frá hóttandi húsagangi til stórreiðarí í Norðurhøvum, 32 min., 2015
Gjógv - millum Norðhavið og Skarðið, 53 min., 2016
Stríðsmenn í Havn - Havnar Arbeiðsmannafelag 100 ár, 80 min., 2017
Ein dagur í sjúkrarøktini, 55 min., 2018
Nýggjár í Vági - ein filmur um samanhald, 45 min., 2018
Teir váðafúsu menninir, Kringvarp Føroya, 50 min., 2019
Tann valdsmikla tøknin, Kringvarp Føroya, 42 min., 2019
Við trøum skal land prýðast, Kringvarp Føroya, 50 min., 2019
Nýggjar røddir á tingi, Kringvarp Føroya, 35 min., 2020
Føstulávint í Sumba, Kringvarp Føroya, 35 min. 2020

Trivia
His father is author, journalist, politician and football announcer Jógvan Arge, who is one of the most famous radio reporters of the Faroe Islands and one of the best selling authors too. He was a member of Tórshavn City Council from 2000 to 2016.

His grandfather, Niels Juel Arge (1920-1995), was the director of the Faroese Broadcasting (Útvarp Føroya) from 1960 til 1990 and was an author too. Their work at the Faroese Broadcasting is recognized as a huge contribution to Faroese culturel heritage. They have written 45 books on various historical matters relating to the Faroe Islands.

His uncle, Magni Arge, was managing director of the Faroese airline, Atlantic Airways from 1995 to 2013. He was in 2015 elected to the Faroese Parliament, Løgtingið, og came second to the leader of the Faroese Republican Party, Høgni Hoydal, to be elected to the Danish Parliament, Folketinget, where he served until 2019, because Hoydal served as the Minister of Fisheries in the Faroe Islands.

His daughter, Turið Arge Samuelsen, is a national handball player for the Faroe Islands and has won the Faroese championship three times and the Faroese cup three times with Kyndil Handball Club, Tórshavn.

References

External links

1971 births
Living people
People from Tórshavn
Association football forwards
Faroese footballers
Faroe Islands international footballers
Uni Arge
Havnar Bóltfelag players
Uni Arge
Faroese expatriate footballers
Expatriate footballers in Iceland
Faroese expatriate sportspeople in Iceland
Faroese male singers
Faroese guitarists
Faroese journalists
Faroese singer-songwriters
Faroese male handball players
Faroese writers
21st-century Danish male singers
21st-century guitarists